ROH 17th Anniversary was a two-night professional wrestling event produced by American promotion Ring of Honor (ROH), which took place Friday, March 15 and Saturday March 16, 2019, at the Sam's Town Hotel and Gambling Hall in the Las Vegas suburb of Sunrise Manor, Nevada. Friday's show was a pay-per-view broadcast, while Saturday's was a set of tapings for ROH's flagship program Ring of Honor Wrestling.

Storylines
This professional wrestling event featured professional wrestling matches, which involve different wrestlers from pre-existing scripted feuds, plots, and storylines that play out on ROH's television programs. Wrestlers portray villains or heroes as they follow a series of events that build tension and culminate in a wrestling match or series of matches.

Results

Night 1 - PPV

Night 2 - TV tapings

See also
2019 in professional wrestling

References

ROH Anniversary Show
2019 in professional wrestling
2019 in Nevada
Professional wrestling in the Las Vegas Valley
March 2019 events in the United States
Events in Sunrise Manor, Nevada